Venable LLP is an American law firm headquartered in Washington, D.C. It is the largest law firm in the state of Maryland. Founded in 1900 by Richard Venable in Baltimore, today Venable has 12 offices across the United States and 800 attorneys who practice in areas such as corporate law, complex litigation, labor and employment, intellectual property, cybersecurity and data privacy, advertising and marketing, entertainment and media, environmental law, bankruptcy and restructuring, and various government affairs. In 2021, Venable was ranked as the 78th highest grossing law firm in the world. From 2020 to 2021, Venable's total revenue grew from $681.8 million to $717 million. Revenue per lawyer saw a similar increase, with each lawyer generating a revenue of $965,031 and each equity partner generating $1.23 million on average.

History 
Venable was founded in 1900 by law professor Richard Venable in Baltimore. It became the second-largest law firm in the Baltimore-Washington area in 1999 when it merged with Washington-based Tucker Flyer. The firm expanded cross country to Los Angeles in 2006.

In 2017, Venable headquarters moved to a new building in Washington, located at 600 Massachusetts Avenue.

In one of the largest law firm mergers of 2018, Venable acquired the New York intellectual property firm Fitzpatrick Cella, which had 100 attorneys at the time.

Venable opened a construction law office in Chicago in January 2021, with firm chairman Stu Ingis stating that the decision to expand was founded on Venable's "history of measured, strategic growth through the addition of talented attorneys and practices in markets that support client needs".

In The American Lawyer AmLaw 100 ranking for 2021, Venable was rated 59th in revenue per lawyer, 71st in profits per lawyer, 76th in profits per equity partner, and 73rd in all-partner compensation, for an overall ranking of 65th.

Shortly after the 2022 Russian invasion of Ukraine, Venable terminated its lobbying deal with Sberbank, Russia's largest bank. It was known that Sberbank  had paid more than $800,000 to Venable for lobbying since 2017, according to Senate records.

In November 2022, Venable announced that it would merge with Genovese Joblove & Battista, a multi-practice Florida-based law firm with offices in Miami, Tampa, and Fort Lauderdale.

Notable alumni and current attorneys

John Banghart, former National Security Council's Director for Federal Cybersecurity
Birch Bayh, former U.S. Senator from Indiana
James H. Burnley IV, former U.S. Secretary of Transportation
John Marshall Butler, former U.S. Senator from Maryland
Benjamin Civiletti, former United States Attorney General
Kathleen G. Cox, Judge of the Circuit Court for Baltimore County, Maryland
C. Carey Deeley, Jr., Judge of the Circuit Court for Baltimore County, Maryland
Doug Emhoff, former Managing Director of Venable's West Coast Offices, Partner at DLA Piper, husband of Vice President of the United States Kamala Harris and Second Gentleman of the United States
Susan K. Gauvey, United States Magistrate Judge of the District Court for the District of Maryland
James W. Gerlach, former United States Representative, Pennsylvania
Asa Hutchinson, Governor of Arkansas, former Undersecretary of Homeland Security and former head of the Drug Enforcement Administration, former U.S. Representative from Arkansas' 3rd congressional district
Amy Berman Jackson,  District Judge on the United States District Court for the District of Columbia
Joseph H.H. Kaplan, former Baltimore City Circuit Court Judge
Benson E. Legg, former Chief Judge, United States District Court for the District of Maryland
Daniel E. Lungren, former United States Representative, California and former Attorney General of California
L. Paige Marvel, Article I federal judge for the United States Tax Court
Powell Moore, former White House Legislative staff member and U.S. Department of State and Department of Defense official
J. Frederick Motz, Senior Judge of the United States District Court for the District of Maryland
Francis D. Murnaghan, Jr., former federal judge on the United States Court of Appeals for the Fourth Circuit 
R. Frances O'Brien, Chief Judge of the General District Court of Arlington, Virginia
Michael T. Pedone, Chief Legal Counsel to Governor Larry Hogan of Maryland
Mark Pryor, former U.S. Senator from Arkansas
William D. Quarles, Jr., former United States District Judge for the District of Maryland
Karl Racine, the first elected Attorney General of the District of Columbia
David E. Rice, United States Bankruptcy Judge
James E. Rogan, former U.S. Representative of California and current judge of the Superior Court of California
John Sarbanes, U.S. Representative, Maryland's 3rd congressional district
Paul Sarbanes, former U.S. Representative from Maryland and former U.S. Senator from Maryland 
Brian Schwalb, Attorney General for the District of Columbia
Ari Schwartz, former member of the White House National Security Council where he served as Special Assistant to the President and Senior Director for Cybersecurity
Bart Stupak, former U.S. Representative from Michigan's 1st congressional district
Roger W. Titus, federal judge on the United States District Court for the District of Maryland
Robert L. Wilkins, United States circuit judge of the United States Court of Appeals for the District of Columbia Circuit
Zuberi Bakari Williams, Judge of the District Court of Maryland, Montgomery County

References

External links
 

Law firms based in Washington, D.C.
Patent law firms
Law firms established in 1900
American companies established in 1900